Sheikh Jafar ibn Hussein ibn Ali Shooshtari (born 1230 AH, 1814/1815 AD, died 20 Safar 1303 AH/28 November 1885) was a prominent Shia scholar from the city of Shooshtar.

Biography 
He was born in 1230 AH in Shooshtar. He was a descendant of Ali ibn Hussain Najjar who was a great Shia scholar of 11th century AH. His paternal lineage is as follows: Jafar son of Hussein son of Hassan son of Ali son of Ali AlNajjar Shooshtari.  He moved to Kadhimiya in early childhood with his father. He was taught by Sheikh Mohammad Al-e-Yasin, Sheikh AbdulNabi Kazemi and Sheikh Ismail ibn Asadollah Kazemi. He then returned to Shooshtar and then went to Karbala to study under Sheikh Mohammad Hossein Esfahani and Sharif ol Olama. Then he moved to Najaf to study under Sheikh Ansari. He returned to Shooshtar in 1255 AH and wrote "Menhaj ol Ershad" and built a Husseinya. In 1287 AH the tomb of prophet Daniel in Susa was repaired by the order of Shaikh Jafar in the hands of Haj Mulla Hassan Memar.  Then he returned to Karbala. He then made a trip to Iran to visit the tomb of Ali Al-Ridha. On the way, he stopped at Ray, where many scholars and clerics on the order of Naser al-Din Shah Qajar visited him and asked him to stay in Tehran. He accepted and moved to Tehran and held the prayers in Marvi Mosque. 

Sheikh Jafar was such a gifted speaker and his sermons were so emotional that they attracted thousands. The number of attendees grew so much that Marvi Mosque could not fit the crowd anymore. With the suggestion of Naser al-Din Shah Qajar, he moved to Sepahsalar Mosque, and according to one of his students, 40,000 people attended his sermons. His sermons were so emotional, that often even clerics in the audience started weeping. Many have reported that Nasser Al-Din Shah Qajar himself was often coming to his sermons in an anonymous outfit.

After spending some time in Tehran, he made a trip to Mashhad and then returned to Tehran again. Shah suggested that he should stay in Tehran, but he said that he wants to be buried next to his master Ali Ibn Abi Talib in Najaf.

Teachers 
 Sheikh Mohammad Hassan Saheb Javaher
 Sheikh Morteza Ansari
 Sheikh Ali ibn Jafar Kashef al Ghata
 Sheikh Mohammad Hossein Saheb Fosool
 Sheikh Ismail Kazemi
 Sheikh Hassan ibn Jafar Kashef Al Ghata
 Sheikh Razi Najafi
 Muhammad Hasan al-Najafi

Students 
 Mirza Mohammad Hamedani
 Seyyed Abdulsamad Jazayeri
 Agha Mirza Ebrahim
 Molla Ahmad Naraghi
 Sheikh Ali ibn Reza Kashef Al Ghata

Death 
Sheikh Jafar became ill on his way to Iraq to visit the tomb of Ali ibn Abi Talib and died in the Karand area between Iran and Iraq. His students moved his body to Iraq and buried him there. There is a mosque in Najaf in his honor.

Books 
 Menhaj ol Ershad, in Persian.
 Al Khasaes Al Hosseinya
 Majales Al Mavaez
 Favaed Al Mashahed va Natayej Al Maghased
 Osol Al Din
 Dame ol Ain
 Lavaeh Allavahein
 Foyouzat Masoudieh
 Aldor Alnazid fi Khasaes Al Hossein Al Shahid

See also 
 Mohammad-Taqi Shoushtari

References

External links 
 Ayatullah Shaykh Ja’far Shustari (R.A.)

1885 deaths
1810s births
Shia scholars of Islam
People from Shushtar